The 2006 Swedish Open was the 2006 edition of the men's tennis tournament. The tournament was held on 10–16 July.  It was the 59th edition of the Swedish Open and was part of the International Series of the 2008 ATP Tour. Second-seeded Tommy Robredo won the singles title.

Finals

Singles

 Tommy Robredo defeated  Nikolay Davydenko, 6–2, 6–1
 It was Robredo's 2nd singles title of the year and the 4th of his career.

Doubles

 Jonas Björkman /  Thomas Johansson defeated  Christopher Kas /  Oliver Marach, 6–3, 4–6, [10–4]

References

External links
 ITF tournament edition details

Swedish Open
Swedish Open
Swedish Open
July 2006 sports events in Europe
Swed